The Russian national futsal team (Sbornaya Rossii po futsalu) is the national futsal team of Russia. The team is controlled by the Russian Football Union and affiliats with UEFA. Because of the 2022 Russian invasion of Ukraine, FIFA and Union of European Football Associations (UEFA) suspended all Russian teams from FIFA and UEFA competitions, whether national representative teams or club teams.

Russia has qualified for seven World Cups (1992–2000, 2008–2021) and for every edition of the European Championships. They won the European Championships once, in 1999, with their best World Cup coming in 2016 where they finished runners-up to Argentina.

History
Russia's FIFA Futsal World Cup history began inauspiciously in 1992, when a poor defensive record of 16 goals conceded in three matches meant elimination at the group stage. A turnaround in Spain four years later saw the Russians claim a third spot. Russia's most recent appearance on the world stage came at the 2000 finals in Guatemala, where they took fourth after a 4–2 defeat to Portugal in the third-place play-off. At the UEFA Futsal Championship in late 2007, a new generation finished third.

Russia was drawn in a group of three nations in qualifying for the FIFA Futsal World Cup Brazil 2008, but after France withdrew at the last minute, the berth in the next round was decided in a single eliminator against Serbia. The Russians won 3–2. At the final tournament, Russia was drawn in Group A. Russia finished second and qualified for the Second round. This time Russia was drawn in Group F. After losing to Spain in the opening match, Russia went on to scrape through to set up a semi-final against Brazil. However, Russia was unable to past Brazil and eventually placed fourth after losing out to Italy in the Third place playoff final.

Because of the 2022 Russian invasion of Ukraine, the FIFA and Union of European Football Associations (UEFA) suspended from FIFA and UEFA competitions all Russian teams, whether national representative teams or club teams.

Results and fixtures
Legend

2021

2022

Coaching staff 
Source:

Players

Current squad
The following players were called up to the squad for the UEFA Futsal Euro 2022.

Notable players
Konstantin Eremenko (1992–2001)
Sergey Zuev (2002–2012)
Vladislav Shayakhmetov (2004–2016)
Pula (2007–2014)
Cirilo (2007–2014)
Eder Lima (2010–)
Sergei Abramov (2010–)
Robinho (2009–)

Competitive record

FIFA Futsal World Cup

UEFA Futsal Championship

Grand Prix de Futsal

Futsal Mundialito

Other tournaments
Thailand Five's
2003 –  third place

Head-to-head record

References

External links
Russia at the Russian Association of Mini-Football

 
Russia
national
1991 establishments in Russia